The 1940 Idaho gubernatorial election was held on November 5. Democratic nominee Chase Clark defeated incumbent Republican C. A. Bottolfsen with 50.48% of the vote.

The next election in 1942 was a rematch, also close, with different results.

Primary elections
Primary elections were held on August 13, 1940.

Democratic primary

Candidates
Chase Clark, Idaho Falls mayor
J. W. Taylor, attorney general 
James Barnes, Hansen farmer, former county commissioner

Republican primary

Candidates
C. A. Bottolfsen, Arco, incumbent governor
Thomas McDougall, Boise attorney

General election

Candidates
Chase A. Clark, Democratic
C. A. Bottolfsen, Republican

Results

References

1940
Idaho
Gubernatorial